The Blue Boy is a 1994 British television film, starring Emma Thompson. In the story, a couple deal with personal conflict and supernatural happenings while spending the weekend at a secluded loch.

Plot
Joe Bonner breaks off his affair with a woman named Beth when his wife, Marie, falls pregnant. To try and fix their marriage, Joe and Marie go to a hotel in rural Scotland. Marie is told about a young boy who drowned in the nearby loch a century ago. While dealing with Joe's infidelity, Marie cannot get the story of the boy out of her mind and frequently sees his image in the lake.

Cast

 Emma Thompson as Marie Bonner
 Adrian Dunbar as Joe Bonner
 Phyllida Law as Marie's mother
 Eleanor Bron as Christine 
 David Horovitch as Robert
 Joanna Roth as Beth

Broadcasting and reception

The film was first shown on BBC Two on 2 January 1995. In America, it aired on 2 October 1994 as part of PBS's Masterpiece Theatre series.

The review in Entertainment Weekly gave the film a C grade, and called it a "slow muddle", saying that it was "frequently impossible to tell why Marie is rattled and teary: Is it because of her husband's philandering or the spectral visions she has of the boy turned blue from the freezing water?" and that the most of the cast "seem[ed] lost and irrelevant" because of the emphasis on Thompson. Conversely, on the British Film Institute website Sergio Angelini praised "the finesse with which it introduces supernatural elements into an otherwise straightforward-seeming narrative about a couple coping with marital problems".

Background
The story of the blue boy, a four-year-old who drowned in nearby Loch Eck, is told about the Coylet Inn at Coylet.

References

External links

1994 television films
1994 films
British television films
BBC television dramas
1995 films